The Beishan Broadcasting Wall is a propaganda loudspeaker in Jinning Township, Kinmen, Republic of China.

History
The structure was built in 1967 as a physiological Cross-Strait warfare instrument directed towards Mainland China. Material such as songs by Taiwanese singer Teresa Teng and speeches inviting enemy soldiers to defect were played through the loudspeakers. Retaliatory speakers also broadcast messages from the other side of the Strait. It was used until late 1970s.

Architecture
The structure consists of 48 speakers which faces the ocean. It stands at a height of around 3-story building.

See also
 Mashan Broadcasting and Observation Station

References

Buildings and structures in Kinmen County
Jinning Township
Loudspeakers
Propaganda in Taiwan
Tourist attractions in Kinmen County
Walls in Taiwan